"This Land Is Your Land" is one of the United States' most famous folk songs. Its lyrics were written by American folk singer Woody Guthrie in 1940 in critical response to Irving Berlin's "God Bless America", with melody based on a Carter Family tune called "When the World's on Fire". When Guthrie was tired of hearing Kate Smith sing "God Bless America" on the radio in the late 1930s, he sarcastically called his song "God Blessed America for Me" before renaming it "This Land Is Your Land".

In 2002, "This Land Is Your Land" was one of 50 recordings chosen that year by the Library of Congress to be added to the National Recording Registry. In 2021, it was listed at No. 229 on Rolling Stone's "Top 500 Greatest Songs of All Time".

Melody
Guthrie's melody was very similar to the melody of "Oh, My Loving Brother", a Baptist gospel hymn that had been recorded by the Carter Family as "When the World's On Fire" and had inspired their "Little Darlin', Pal of Mine." He used the same melody for the chorus and the verses.

Guthrie's song, however, had a different melodic structure from the hymn or the similar Carter Family melodies, and he used only the first half of those melodies in his song. The melodic structure of the presumed model(s) can be described as "ABCD"—a new melodic phrase for each of its four lines. Guthrie's structure, however, is "ABAC". In other words, Guthrie repeats the beginning of the melody (the "A" section) for his third line; the melodic phrase for his fourth line ("This land was made for you and me") is found in neither the hymn nor the Carter Family melodies.

Original 1940 lyrics
Following are the original lyrics as composed on February 23, 1940, in Guthrie's room at the Hanover House hotel at 43rd St. and 6th Ave. (101 West 43rd St.) in New York, showing his strikeouts. The line "This land was made for you and me" does not literally appear in the manuscript at the end of each verse, but is implied by Guthrie's writing of those words at the top of the page and by his subsequent singing of the line with those words.

According to Joe Klein, after Guthrie composed it "he completely forgot about the song, and didn't do anything with it for another five years." (Since there is a March 1944 recording of the song, Klein should have said "four years".)

1944 version lyrics
In 1944 during World War II, Guthrie prepared another version which drops the two verses that are critical of the United States from the original: Verse four, about private property, and verse six, about hunger.  In 1940, Guthrie was in the anti-war phase he entered after the 1939 Molotov-Ribbentrop Pact, during which he wrote songs praising the Soviet invasion of Poland, attacking President Roosevelt's loans to Finland in defense against the Soviets, and ridiculing lend-lease aid to the United Kingdom. By 1944, after Germany had invaded the Soviet Union in 1941, Guthrie returned to vigorous support for U.S. involvement in Europe and a more anti-nationalism stance.

Confirmation of two other verses

A March 1944 recording in the possession of the Smithsonian, the earliest known recording of the song, has the "private property" verse included.  This version was recorded the same day as 75 other songs.  This was confirmed by several archivists for Smithsonian who were interviewed as part of the History Channel program Save Our History – Save our Sounds. The 1944 recording with this fourth verse can be found on Woody Guthrie: This Land is Your Land: The Asch Recordings Volume 1, where it is track 14.

Woodyguthrie.org has a variant:

A 1945 pamphlet which omitted the last two verses has caused some question as to whether the original song did in fact contain the full text. The original manuscript confirms both of these verses.

As with other folk songs, it was sung with different words at various times although the motives for this particular change of lyrics may involve the possible political interpretations of the verses. Recordings of Guthrie have him singing the verses with different words.

The verses critical of America are not often performed in schools or official functions. They can be best interpreted as a protest against the vast income inequalities that exist in the United States, and against the sufferings of millions during the Great Depression. The US, Guthrie insists, was made—and could still be made—for you and me. This interpretation is consistent with such other Guthrie songs as "Pretty Boy Floyd" and Guthrie's lifelong struggle for social justice.

The song was revived in the 1960s, when several artists of the new folk movement, including Bob Dylan, The Kingston Trio, Trini Lopez, Jay and the Americans, and The New Christy Minstrels all recorded versions, inspired by its political message. Peter, Paul and Mary recorded the song in 1962 for their Moving album. The Seekers recorded the song for their 1965 album, A World of Our Own. It was performed many times by the cyclist choir, accompanied by guitarists and a wash-tub bassist, during the Wandering Wheels historic 1966 U.S. coast-to-coast bicycle trip. At the founding convention of the Canadian social democratic New Democratic Party, a version of the song was sung by the attending delegates. 

In March 1977, David Carradine, who had personified Woody Guthrie in Hal Ashby's 1976 biopic Bound for Glory, appeared at the Dinah Shore's show Dinah! In it, he performed a version of the song which included the two verses, with some variations:

It must be noted that in the film itself, the song is performed in the closing credits by several singers, starting with David Carradine and including Woody Guthrie. The verse about the "No Trespassing" sign appears there, but the two verses are not in the soundtrack album's version.

Bruce Springsteen first began performing it live on the River Tour in 1980, and released one such performance of it on Live/1975–85, in which he called it "about one of the most beautiful songs ever written."

The song was performed by Springsteen and Pete Seeger, accompanied by Seeger's grandson, Tao Rodríguez-Seeger, at We Are One: The Obama Inaugural Celebration at the Lincoln Memorial on January 18, 2009. The song was restored to the original lyrics (including the 'There was a big high wall there' and 'Nobody living can ever stop me' verses) for this performance (as per Pete Seeger's request) with exceptions of the changes in the end of the 'Private Property' and 'Relief Office' verses; the former's final line was changed from "This land was made for you and me" to "That side was made for you and me," and the latter's third and fourth lines to "As they stood hungry, I stood there whistling, This land was made for you and me," from the original lyrics, "As they stood there hungry, I stood there asking, Is this land made for you and me?"

Voice actress and children's entertainer Debi Derryberry recorded a version for her musical album What A Way To Play in 2006.

In 2010, Peter Yarrow and Paul Stookey, the surviving members of Peter, Paul and Mary, requested that the National Organization for Marriage stop using their recording of "This Land is Your Land" at their rallies, stating in a letter that the organization's philosophy was "directly contrary to the advocacy position" held by the group.

In 2019, Arlo Guthrie led a version of "This Land is Your Land" at the July 4 Boston Pops concert. Guthrie sang the 'no trespassing' verse but substituted the first line of the 'private property' verse ('There was a big high wall there, that tried to stop me / And on the wall it said "no trespassing"'), and Queen Latifah sang the 'freedom highway' verse. The 'Relief Office' verse was not included.

Arlo Guthrie tells a story in concerts on occasion, of his mother returning from a dance tour of China, and reporting around the Guthrie family dinner table that at one point in the tour she was serenaded by Chinese children singing the song. Arlo says Woody was incredulous: "The Chinese? Singing 'This land is your land, this land is my land? From California to the New York island?

On January 20, 2021, during the presidential inauguration of Joe Biden, Jennifer Lopez performed some verses of the song as part of a medley with America the Beautiful. She excluded verses critical of the United States and interposed a Spanish-language translation of a portion of the Pledge of Allegiance.

Variations
As is the case with many well-known songs, it has been the subject of an enormous number of variations and parodies. They include:

Versions about other countries
Many variants of the song have been recorded with lyrics adjusted to fit diverse countries, regions, languages, and ethnic groups. They include:

Other variations 

The song has been recorded by many performers over the years, ranging from American Country legend Glen Campbell, hardcore band Hated Youth, all the way to Turkish performer Nuri Sesigüzel to reggae group The Melodians.

A few other notable recordings are by:
Peter, Paul and Mary – for their album Moving (1963)
Bing Crosby – for the album America, I Hear You Singing (1964)
The Seekers – in the album A World of Our Own (1965)
Connie Francis – included in her album Connie Francis and The Kids Next Door (1966)
Tennessee Ernie Ford – recorded for his album America the Beautiful (1970)
 David Carradine - in the soundtrack album of Bound for Glory, Woody Guthrie's biopic directed by Hal Ashby (1976)
 Greg & Steve - on their album, Holidays & Special Times (1989).
Sharon Jones & the Dap-Kings – in the album Naturally (2005).
Johnny Logan – on the album, Irishman in America (2008).
 Raffi – on his album, Love Bug (2014).

A version called "This badge is your badge", about FC United of Manchester, was written by fan Mickey O'Farrell, and is often sung by fans at the club's matches.

In film, television, internet, books, and advertising

The song has been sung by characters in many film and television productions, including Bob Roberts (1992), Stepmom (1998), Full House, The Luck of the Irish (a Disney Channel original movie), Up in the Air (2009) and by Renée Zellweger in the 2010 film My Own Love Song.

It has been parodied many times, including:
 A lyrically restored version of the song was featured in "Disneyland Showtime", a 1970 episode of The Wonderful World of Disney, performed by The Kids of the Kingdom with Jay and Donny Osmond. Here, the lyrics were changed to describe the many attractions and experiences at Disneyland.
 In the Home Improvement episode "Too Many Cooks" (1994), Tim refers to Al as "Al 'This Land Is' Borland".
 A 1999 episode of Friends when Joey meets a man he believes to be his "hand-twin", resulting in the lyric "This hand is my hand."
 The 1999 film Sonnenallee features a version performed by Alexander Hacke, changing the geographical references in the first verse to match those of East Germany, where the film takes place.
 The Simpsons episode "Lisa the Treehugger" (2000) with the words changed to "This log is my log, this log is your log" in reference to a runaway giant redwood tree.
 The Arthur episode "The Pride of Lakewood" with the words changed to "This school's a great school, this school's a cool school".
 The June 27, 2009 episode of A Prairie Home Companion by Arlo Guthrie as "This Song is My Song".
 In fourth-season episode of The Big Bang Theory, the Indian-born Raj Koothrappali recites the first verse of the song out of fear of deportation in an interview with an FBI agent to clarify his relationship with the United States.
 It was featured as soundtrack for the 2011 documentary The Ambassador.
 In the television series Northern Exposure (episode "Northern Hospitality" Season 5 #16), Holling Vincoeur sings a modified version with references to Canada to his wife, Shelly Vincoeur.
 Indie rock band My Morning Jacket recorded the song for a North Face advertising campaign in 2014.
 In 2016, Budweiser temporarily rebranded their flagship beer "America", and included the lyrics "...from the redwood forests, to the gulf stream waters, this land was made for you and me" on their labels.
 Pop singer Lady Gaga sang a few phrases of the song at the beginning of the performance of her halftime show of the 2017 Super Bowl.
 Los Angeles-based Latin band Chicano Batman sang a cover for a commercial for Johnnie Walker including both English and Spanish lyrics.
 Country artist Sam Hunt covered the song for Bright: The Album, the soundtrack to the 2017 film, Bright.
 Musician Dave Matthews often includes a few lines when he sings the live version of "Don't Drink the Water" (which is about how America stole land from Natives while massacring them along the way) as an ironic juxtaposition in order to highlight the fact that while Americans claim the land as "ours", it was not theirs to take.
 The version by Sharon Jones & the Dap-Kings is featured in the opening credits of Up in the Air (2009), and in the closing credits of the 2019 Netflix documentary Knock Down the House.
 The FX on Hulu series Mrs. America (episode 8 "Houston") depicts a group of women singing the song with a guitar. Actress Sarah Paulson's  character (Alice McCray) joins in by singing one of the Variant Verses often omitted ("Nobody living can ever stop me, As I go walking that freedom highway; Nobody living can ever make me turn back, This land was made for you and me"). Another character points to McCray that the song was written by Guthrie, referred as "a socialist" (a point relevant in the dialogue to state a contradiction between McCray's conservative views and her love for the song). This could be the reason to pick such an obscure verse, as this particular verse can only be linked to Guthrie and not to one of the many versions of the song by other artist.

Copyright controversy

A widely published quote of Guthrie's about copyright has been cited by some scholars to suggest that he was against copyright protection for his work:

This song is Copyrighted in U.S., under Seal of Copyright # 154085, for a period of 28 years, and anybody caught singin it without our permission, will be mighty good friends of ourn, cause we don't give a dern. Publish it. Write it. Sing it. Swing to it. Yodel it. We wrote it, that's all we wanted to do.

Kembrew McLeod suggested this quote was made by Guthrie in reference to "This Land is Your Land", but that claim is inaccurate. The copyright registration number "#154085" referenced in the quote is for Guthrie's song "California!" (also known as "California! California!" or "California! The Land of the Sky!"). The quote was printed under the lyrics to "California!" in a songbook Guthrie made in 1937 – three years before the first draft of "This Land" was written.

A number of different organizations claim copyright for the song.

According to the Carter Family, the melody came from a tune that A.P. Carter had found and recorded with Sarah and Maybelle Carter prior to 1934 and was not original to Guthrie.

In July 2004, the website JibJab hosted a parody of the song, with George W. Bush and John Kerry singing altered lyrics to comment on the U.S. presidential election that November, resulting in The Richmond Organization, a music publisher that owns the copyright to Guthrie's tune through its Ludlow Music unit, threatening legal action.

JibJab then sued to affirm their parody was fair use, with the Electronic Frontier Foundation (EFF) acting for them. As part of their research on the case they found that the song had been first published by Woody Guthrie in 1945, although the copyright was not registered until 1956. This meant that when Ludlow applied to renew the copyright in 1984 they were 11 years too late as the song had been in the public domain since 1973 (28 years from first publication). The Richmond Organization settled with Jibjab shortly thereafter, agreeing that JibJab were free to distribute their parody. In an interview on NPR, Arlo Guthrie said that he thought the parody was hilarious and he thought Woody would have loved it too. Richmond still, however, claims copyright on other versions of the song, such as those appearing in the 1956 and later publications. Legally, such claims only apply to original elements of the song that were not in the public domain version.

The Richmond Organization and Ludlow Music were sued in 2016 over their claims of copyright in a lawsuit led by Randall Newman. In a similar case, Newman previously successfully argued the song "Happy Birthday to You" was public domain. In February 2020, Judge P. Kevin Castel of the Federal District Court in Manhattan dismissed the case because the plaintiffs had already paid the license fee, so there was no legal dispute to adjudicate.

References

External links

 Library of Congress download

 The Bound for Glory exhibit at the Museum of Musical Instruments includes images of Guthrie
 lyrics as copyrighted in 1956
 

1944 songs
American folk songs
American patriotic songs
Answer songs
Bob Dylan songs
Bruce Springsteen songs
Counting Crows songs
Jay and the Americans songs
Peter, Paul and Mary songs
Glen Campbell songs
Protest songs
Songs against racism and xenophobia
Songs about freedom
Songs written by Woody Guthrie
The Kingston Trio songs
Trini Lopez songs
United States National Recording Registry recordings
Woody Guthrie songs